The 2019 LA Galaxy season was the club's twenty-fourth season of existence, their twenty-fourth in Major League Soccer.

Players

Squad information 
At the end of the season.

Transfers

Transfers in

Draft picks 

Draft picks are not automatically signed to the team roster. Only those who are signed to a contract will be listed as transfers in. Only trades involving draft picks and executed after the start of 2019 MLS SuperDraft will be listed in the notes.

Transfers out

Competitions

Preseason 
All times are in Pacific Time Zone.

The preseason schedule was announced on December 21, 2018.

Major League Soccer

Standings

Overall

Western Conference

Regular season 
All times are in Pacific Time Zone.

 
 

The first match of the 2019 season was announced on December 20, 2018. The full schedule was released on January 7, 2019.

Playoffs 

All times are in Pacific Time Zone.

First round

Conference Semifinals

U.S. Open Cup 

All times are in Pacific Time Zone.

Fourth round 
The draw was held on May 30, 2019.

Round of 16 
The draw was held on June 13, 2019.

Leagues Cup 

All times are in Pacific Time Zone.

The tournament and schedule was announced on May 29, 2019.

Quarterfinal

Semifinal

Statistics

Appearances and goals
Last updated on 11 August 2019

|-
! colspan=14 style=background:#dcdcdc; text-align:center|Goalkeepers

|-
! colspan=14 style=background:#dcdcdc; text-align:center|Defenders

|-
! colspan=14 style=background:#dcdcdc; text-align:center|Midfielders

|-
! colspan=14 style=background:#dcdcdc; text-align:center|Forwards

|-
! colspan=14 style=background:#dcdcdc; text-align:center| Players who have made an appearance or had a squad number this season but have left the club

|-
|}

Top scorers

See also 
 2019 in American soccer
 2019 LA Galaxy II season

References 

LA Galaxy
LA Galaxy
LA Galaxy
LA Galaxy
LA Galaxy seasons